Alireza Jamali (Persian: علیرضا جمالی born 1 April 1990 in Tehran, Iran) is an Iranian professional footballer who presently plays for Sanat Naft Abadan F.C. of the Persian Gulf Pro League. A native of Abadan, Iran, Jamali can operate in several positions including center midfield, attacking midfield, and forward.

Career

Portugal
Back in 2016, S.L. Benfica subordinate Lusitano VRSA got Jamali's services, with the midfielder starting his first match in a 4-2 loss to Louletano D.C. in the Campeonato de Portugal. Having an amicable relationship with his coach, Ricardo Sousa, Jamali was praised by him, with Sousa saying that Jamali was fit for the team.

Philippines
Becoming a Pachanga Diliman F.C. player in 2011, the Iranian netted two goals in three appearances in the second half of the 2013 United Football League.

Lanexang
Set to join Lao Premier League champions Lanexang United in 2015, Jamali lifted the 2015 Lao Prime Minister's Cup with them, helping the team with a solid performance in the group stage by providing a goal and assist in a 6-2 beating of Lao Police Club.

The Iranian media spread rumors that he was on the verge of going to a Serbian club but the deal never happened.

References

Iranian footballers
Iranian expatriate footballers
Association football midfielders
Living people
1990 births
Expatriate footballers in Laos
Expatriate footballers in the Philippines
Lanexang United F.C. players
Foolad FC players
PAS Hamedan F.C. players
Expatriate footballers in Portugal
Sanat Naft Abadan F.C. players
People from Abadan, Iran
Sportspeople from Khuzestan province